Caryedon is a genus of pea and bean weevils in the beetle family Chrysomelidae. There are about 11 described species in Caryedon.

Species
These 11 species belong to the genus Caryedon:
 Caryedon acaciae Gyllenhal, 1833
 Caryedon angeri Semenov, 1896
 Caryedon germari Kuster, 1845
 Caryedon gonagra (Fabricius, 1798)
 Caryedon kizilkumensis Ter-Minassian, 1977
 Caryedon lagonychii Motschulsky, 1873
 Caryedon lisaeae Southgate, 1971
 Caryedon mesra Johnson, Southgate & Delobel, 2004
 Caryedon prosopidis Arora, 1977
 Caryedon serratus (Olivier, 1790) (groundnut bruchid)
 Caryedon yemenensis Decelle, 1979

References

Further reading

External links

 

Bruchinae
Articles created by Qbugbot
Chrysomelidae genera